"I'm In" is a song co-written and recorded by American country music singer Radney Foster. He recorded it on his 1999 studio album See What You Want to See, which was released on the Arista Austin label. In 2000, The Kinleys released it as a single from the album II, and ten years later, Keith Urban released his version as the fifth single from his album Defying Gravity. Urban's version of the song was a number two hit on the country music charts.

Content
The song is about a male narrator who expresses his desire to commit with his lover, telling her that "If you need a lover and a friend / Baby, I'm in."

Radney Foster version
Radney Foster wrote the song with Georgia Middleman, and recorded it as a duet with Abra Moore on his 1999 album See What You Want to See. This version was released as the first single from the album, and did not enter the charts. Two weeks before the slated release of the album, See What You Want to See was put on hold due to label restructuring.

Critical reception
Stephen Thomas Erlewine of Allmusic called "I'm In" one of "the best moments" on the album, saying that it "showcase[s] him at his best as a songwriter while successfully delivering a fresh, updated sound."

The Kinleys version

In 1999, country music duo The Kinleys recorded a version of "I'm In" for the album II, released in 2000 via Epic Records. Foster co-produced The Kinleys' version of the song, and five other tracks on the album.

Critical reception
Country Standard Time critic Jeffrey B. Remz, in his review of II, said that The Kinleys' rendition was "radio friendly" and that the duo "strip[s]" the song "from its rootsy feel by going for a bigger, churning sound." Gene Harbrecht of the Orlando Sentinel called it a "hopeful counterpoint punctuated by soaring vocals."

Music video
The music video was directed by Eric Welch and premiered in late 2000.

Chart performance
The Kinleys' version debuted on the Billboard Hot Country Singles & Tracks (now Hot Country Songs) charts dated for the week ending October 28, 2000. It spent twenty-two weeks on that chart and peaked at 35. It was the third and final single from that album, and the last charting single for the duo.

Keith Urban version

Keith Urban recorded the song for his 2009 album Defying Gravity. In a radio interview, Urban told KILT-FM that his rendition would be the fifth single from the album, and that he would perform it at the Academy of Country Music awards show on April 18, 2010. This is the second track from Foster's album See What You Want to See that Urban has covered; he had previously recorded "Raining on Sunday" (which follows "I'm In" on that album) and released his version of that song in 2003 from his 2002 album Golden Road. It is also Urban's first American single that does not have a music video for it.

Composition
Urban's rendition of the song is set in the key of F major and has a main chord pattern of F-C-Gm7-Bsus2 and a moderately fast tempo as well as a vocal range of C-A.

Critical reception
Sam Gazdziak of Engine 145 gave Urban's rendition a "thumbs-up", saying that it was "not as good as the original" but "a good introduction to the song." His review criticized the guitar solo, which he thought was "out of place". Slant Magazines Jonathan Keefe also considered it inferior to The Kinleys' version, saying that Urban's version was "tepid." Allmusic critic Thom Jurek compared the sound of Urban's version to that of The Rolling Stones, saying that it would be an "excellent choice for a single".
Kevin John Coyne from Country Universe gave the song a B− grade and stated that Keith Urban "makes everything sound so effortless that it can be easy to overlook songs that legitimately could have used more effort" though "if he’s going to use outside material, he should be more selective than he was this time around."

Chart performance

Year-end charts

References

1998 singles
2000 singles
2010 singles
1998 songs
Radney Foster songs
The Kinleys songs
Keith Urban songs
Song recordings produced by Dann Huff
Songs written by Radney Foster
Arista Nashville singles
Epic Records singles
Capitol Records Nashville singles
Songs written by Georgia Middleman